The 2003 NCAA Division II women's basketball tournament involved 64 teams playing in a single-elimination tournament to determine the NCAA Division II women's college basketball national champion. It began March 14, 2003 and concluded with the championship game on March 29, 2003.

The first three rounds were hosted by top-seeded teams in regional play. The eight regional winners met for the quarterfinal and semifinals, better known as the "Elite Eight" and "Final Four" respectively, and National Championship game at the St. Joseph Civic Arena in St. Joseph, MO.

Regionals

East - California, Pennsylvania
Location: Hamer Hall Host: California University of Pennsylvania

South Atlantic - Salisbury, North Carolina
Location: Goodman Gym Host: Catawba College

South Central - Topeka, Kansas
Location: Lee Arena Host: Washburn University

Great Lakes - Indianapolis, Indiana
Location: Nicoson Hall Host: University of Indianapolis

South - Russellville, Arkansas
Location: Tucker Coliseum Host: Arkansas Tech University

Northeast - Waltham, Massachusetts
Location: Dana Center Host: Bentley College

North Central - Brookings, South Dakota
Location: Frost Arena Host: South Dakota State University

West - Seattle, Washington
Location: Royal Brougham Pavilion Host: Seattle Pacific University

Elite Eight – St. Joseph, Missouri 
Location: St. Joseph Civic Arena Host: Missouri Western State College

All-Tournament team

Melissa Pater, South Dakota St. - Most Outstanding Player
Heather Sieler, South Dakota St. 
Sharell Snardon, Northern Kentucky
Carone Harris, Central Arkansas
Keri Flynn, Bentley

See also
 2003 NCAA Division I women's basketball tournament
 2003 NCAA Division III women's basketball tournament
 2003 NAIA Division I women's basketball tournament
 2003 NAIA Division II women's basketball tournament
 2003 NCAA Division II men's basketball tournament

References
 2003 NCAA Division II women's basketball tournament jonfmorse.com

NCAA Division II women's basketball tournament
NCAA tournament
2003 in sports in Missouri